Soulpepper is a Toronto, Ontario-based theatre company founded to present classic plays. The following is a chronological list of the productions that it has staged since its inception.

1998
The Misanthrope by Molière
Don Carlos by Friedrich Schiller

1999
Our Town by Thornton Wilder
The Play's the Thing by Ferenc Molnár
A Streetcar Named Desire by Tennessee Williams
Endgame by Samuel Beckett
Platonov by Anton Chekhov

2000
The Mill on the Floss by George Eliot
Platonov by Anton Chekhov
Twelfth Night by William Shakespeare
Krapp's Last Tape by Samuel Beckett
The School for Wives by Molière
Betrayal by Harold Pinter

2001
A Flea in Her Ear by Georges Feydeau
Present Laughter by Noël Coward
La Ronde by Arthur Schnitzler
Uncle Vanya by Anton Chekhov
The Bald Soprano by Eugène Ionesco
The Lesson by Eugène Ionesco
MacHomer Rick Miller

2002
The Winter's Tale by William Shakespeare
A Chorus of Disapproval by Alan Ayckbourn
Miss Julie by August Strindberg
The Maids by Jean Genet
Absolutely Chekhov by Anton Chekhov
Uncle Vanya by Anton Chekhov
The Beggar's Opera by John Gay

2003
No Man's Land by Harold Pinter
Happy Days by Samuel Beckett
Phèdre by Jean Racine
She Stoops to Conquer by Oliver Goldsmith
The Play's the Thing by Ferenc Molnár

2004
Waiting for Godot by Samuel Beckett
Nathan the Wise by Gotthold Ephraim Lessing
The Dumb Waiter by Harold Pinter
The Zoo Story by Edward Albee
Translations by Brian Friel
Mirandolina by Carlo Goldoni
Hamlet by William Shakespeare

2005
Hamlet by William Shakespeare
Olympia (play) by Ferenc Molnár
The Wild Duck by Henrik Ibsen
Fool for Love by Sam Shepard
The Long Valley by John Steinbeck

2006
Chairs by Eugène Ionesco
The Importance Of Being Earnest by Oscar Wilde
American Buffalo by David Mamet
King Lear by William Shakespeare
Our Town by Thornton Wilder
The Caretaker by Harold Pinter
A Christmas Carol by Charles Dickens

2007
The Threepenny Opera by Bertolt Brecht and Kurt Weill
John Gabriel Borkman by Henrik Ibsen
Leaving Home by David French
Top Girls by Caryl Churchill
The Time Of Your Life by William Saroyan
Three Sisters by Anton Chekhov
Mary Stuart by Friedrich Schiller
Blithe Spirit by Noël Coward
Our Town by Thornton Wilder

2008
Salt-Water Moon by David French
The Odd Couple by Neil Simon
As You Like It by William Shakespeare
'Night Mother by Marsha Norman
Under Milk Wood by Dylan Thomas
Uncle Vanya by Anton Chekhov
The Way of the World by William Congreve
Black Comedy by Peter Shaffer
The Real Inspector Hound by Tom Stoppard
Ring Round the Moon by Jean Anouilh
A Raisin in the Sun by Lorraine Hansberry
Top Girls by Caryl Churchill
A Christmas Carol by Charles Dickens

2009
Travesties by Tom Stoppard
Glengarry Glen Ross by David Mamet
Loot by Joe Orton
Awake and Sing! by Clifford Odets
Of the Fields, Lately by David French
Billy Bishop Goes to War by John Gray and Eric Peterson
Who's Afraid of Virginia Woolf? by Edward Albee
The Guardsman by Ferenc Molnár
Antigone by Sophocles (new adaptation by Evan Webber and Chris Abraham)
Parfumerie by Miklós László
Civil Elegies by Dennis Lee

2010
Billy Bishop Goes to War by John Gray and Eric Peterson
Oh, What a Lovely War! by Joan Littlewood and Theatre Workshop
The Aleph by Jorge Luis Borges (new adaptation by Daniel Brooks and Diego Matamoros)
Glengarry Glen Ross by David Mamet
Faith Healer by Brian Friel
Waiting for the Parade by John Murrell
Jitters by David French
The Cherry Orchard by Anton Chekhov (new adaptation by Daniel Brooks and members of the Soulpepper Academy)
A Month in the Country by Ivan Turgenev
What the Butler Saw by Joe Orton
Doc by Sharon Pollock
A Raisin in the Sun by Lorraine Hansberry
Death of a Salesman by Arthur Miller
A Christmas Carol by Charles Dickens

2011
Oleanna by David Mamet
A Midsummer Night's Dream by William Shakespeare
The Fantasticks by Harvey Schmidt and Tom Jones
The Time Of Your Life by William Saroyan
Our Town by Thornton Wilder
Billy Bishop Goes to War by John Gray and Eric Peterson
Fronteras Americanas by Guillermo Verdecchia
The Aleph by Jorge Luis Borges (new adaptation by Daniel Brooks and Diego Matamoros)
The Glass Menagerie by Tennessee Williams
The Kreutzer Sonata by Leo Tolstoy (adaptation by Ted Dykstra, in association with Art of Time Ensemble)
Exit the King by Eugène Ionesco
White Biting Dog by Judith Thompson
The Price by Arthur Miller
The Odd Couple by Neil Simon
Ghosts by Henrik Ibsen
Parfumerie by Miklós László

2012
Long Day's Journey Into Night by Eugene O'Neill
High Life by Lee MacdougallHome by David StoreyYou Can't Take It with You by Moss Hart and George S. KaufmanKim's Convenience by Ins ChoiSpeed-the-Plow by David MametThe Sunshine Boys by Neil SimonThe Royal Comedians by Mikhail BulgakovThe Crucible by Arthur MillerDeath of a Salesman by Arthur MillerEndgame by Samuel BeckettA Christmas Carol by Charles Dickens

2013Rosencrantz and Guildenstern Are Dead - by Tom StoppardTrue West - by Sam ShepardLa Ronde - by Arthur Schnitzler, adapted by Jason ShermanThe Barber of Seville - by Pierre Beaumarchais and Gioachino Rossini, adapted by Michael O'Brien and John MillardKim's Convenience - by Ins ChoiEntertaining Mr. Sloane – by Joe OrtonGreat Expectations - by Charles Dickens, adapted by Michael ShamataAngels in America: A Gay Fantasia on National Themes (Part One) - by Tony KushnerThe Norman Conquests - by Alan AyckbournFarther West - by John MurrellAlligator Pie - by Dennis LeeParfumerie'' - by Miklós László

See also
Canadian Stage production history (1987), Toronto
Theatre Passe Muraille production history (1969), Toronto

References

Canadian theatre company production histories
Theatre in Toronto